This is a list of video games published by or under license from Games Workshop.



Warhammer Fantasy 
The following games are set in the Warhammer Fantasy Battle, Blood Bowl and HeroQuest settings.

Age of Sigmar 
The following games are set in the Warhammer Age of Sigmar setting.

Warhammer 40,000 
The following games are set in the Warhammer 40,000, Epic, Space Hulk and Space Crusade settings.

Other games 
The following games are Games Workshop intellectual property but not set in the Warhammer 40,000 or Warhammer Fantasy Battle settings.

Cancelled games 
The following games were cancelled before being launched to the market.

References 

 
 
Games Workshop
 
 
Video game franchises